|}

The Vintage Stakes is a Group 2 flat horse race in Great Britain open to two-year-old horses. It is run at Goodwood over a distance of 7 furlongs (1,408 metres), and it is scheduled to take place each year in late July or early August.

History
The event was established in 1975, and it was originally classed at Listed level. During the early part of its history it was sponsored by Lanson and known as the Lanson Champagne Vintage Stakes. It was given Group 3 status in 1986.

The Vintage Stakes was promoted to Group 2 level in 2003, and from this point it was sponsored by Veuve Clicquot. It is currently held on the opening day of the five-day Glorious Goodwood meeting.

Several winners of the Vintage Stakes have gone on to achieve victory in one of the following year's Classics. The most recent was Galileo Gold, the winner of the 2000 Guineas in 2016.

Records
Leading jockey (6 wins):
 Willie Carson – Troy (1978), Church Parade (1980), Mukaddamah (1990), Dr Devious (1991), Maroof (1992), Alhaarth (1995)
 Frankie Dettori -  Aljabr (1998), Naheef (2001), Rio de la Plata (2007), Orizaba (2008), Galileo Gold (2015), Angel Bleu (2021) 

Leading trainer (6 wins):
 Dick Hern – Riboboy (1975), Sky Ship (1976), Troy (1978), Church Parade (1980), Petoski (1984), Alhaarth (1995)
 Henry Cecil – Marathon Gold (1979), Trojan Fen (1983), Faustus (1985), High Estate (1988), Be My Chief (1989), Eltish (1994)

Winners

See also
 Horse racing in Great Britain
 List of British flat horse races

References
 Paris-Turf: 
 Racing Post:

 galopp-sieger.de – Vintage Stakes.
 ifhaonline.org – International Federation of Horseracing Authorities – Vintage Stakes (2019).
 pedigreequery.com – Vintage Stakes – Goodwood.
 

Flat races in Great Britain
Goodwood Racecourse
Flat horse races for two-year-olds
Recurring sporting events established in 1975
1975 establishments in England